Constantine's Bridge (Konstantinov most) was a Roman bridge over the Danube used to reconquer Dacia. It was completed  in 328 AD and remained in use for four decades.

It was officially opened on 5 July 328 AD in the presence of emperor Constantine the Great.

Construction
It was a construction with masonry piers and wooden arch bridge and with wooden superstructure. It was constructed between Sucidava (present-day Corabia, Olt County, Romania) and Oescus (modern Gigen, Pleven Province, Bulgaria), by Constantine the Great. The bridge was apparently used until the mid-4th century, the main reason for this assumption being that Valens had to cross the Danube using a bridge of boats at Constantiana Daphne during his campaign against the Goths in 367.

In 1934 Dumitru Tudor published the first complete work regarding the bridge, and the last systematic approach on the north bank of the Danube was performed in 1968 by Octavian Toropu.

Technical data

The bridge had two abutment piers at each end, serving as gates for the bridge.

See also 
List of Roman bridges
Roman architecture
Roman engineering
List of crossings of the Danube
Constantine's Wall

Notes

Bibliography

External links 

 Constantine's Bridge on wikimapia.org

328 works
Bridges completed in the 4th century
Roman bridges
Bridges over the Danube
Demolished bridges
Bridges in Romania
Bridges in Bulgaria
Roman Dacia
Ancient Bulgaria
Olt County
Buildings and structures in Pleven Province
Corabia